American Airlines Flight 587 was a regularly scheduled international passenger flight from John F. Kennedy International Airport to Las Américas International Airport in Santo Domingo, the capital of the Dominican Republic. On November 12, 2001, the Airbus A300B4-605R flying the route crashed into the neighborhood of Belle Harbor on the Rockaway Peninsula of Queens, New York City, shortly after takeoff. All 260 people aboard the plane (251 passengers and 9 crew members) were killed, as well as five people on the ground. It is the second-deadliest aviation accident in U.S. history, behind the crash of American Airlines Flight 191 in 1979, and the second-deadliest aviation incident involving an Airbus A300.

The location of the accident, and the fact that it took place two months and one day after the September 11 attacks on the World Trade Center in nearby Manhattan, initially spawned fears of another terrorist attack, but the National Transportation Safety Board (NTSB) attributed the disaster to the first officer's overuse of rudder controls in response to wake turbulence from a preceding Japan Airlines Boeing 747-400 that took off minutes before it. According to the NTSB, the aggressive use of the rudder controls by the first officer stressed the vertical stabilizer until it separated from the aircraft. The airliner's two engines also separated from the aircraft before impact due to the intense forces.

Aircraft and crew 
The accident aircraft, registration  was an Airbus A300 B4-605R delivered new to American Airlines in July 1988. The aircraft's first flight was in December 1987 and was the first "R" model A300-600 built.  On the day of the accident, it was in a two-class seating configuration with space for 251 passengers – 16 business-class seats and 235 economy-class seats. The aircraft was powered by two CF6-80C2A5 engines. On board were nine flight crew members, including 42-year-old Captain Edward States  who was the pilot monitoring and undertaking radio communications, and 34-year-old First Officer Sten Molin, who was the pilot flying; 251 passengers boarded the flight bound for Santo Domingo.

Accident 

The aircraft taxied to Runway 31L behind a Japan Airlines (JAL) Boeing 747-400 (JAL Flight 47) preparing for takeoff. The JAL flight was cleared for takeoff at 9:11:08 am EST. At 9:11:36, the tower controller cautioned Flight 587 about potential wake turbulence from a preceding B747.

At 9:13:28, the A300 was cleared for takeoff and left the runway at 9:14:29, about 1 minute and 40 seconds after the JAL flight. The controller instructed the aircraft to climb to and maintain . The flight data recorder (FDR) showed that the events leading to the crash began when the aircraft hit wake turbulence from the JAL flight in front of it at 9:15:36. In response to a new wave of turbulence, Molin alternated between moving the rudder from the right to the left and back again in quick succession from 9:15:52, causing sideslip until the lateral force caused composite lugs that attached the vertical stabilizer to fail at 9:15:58.

The aircraft pitched downwards after the stabilizer loss. As the pilots struggled to control the aircraft, it went into a flat spin. The resulting aerodynamic loads sheared both engines from the aircraft; they fell several blocks north and east of the main wreckage site, causing minor damage to a gas station and major damage to one home and a boat. The loss of engines cut power to the FDR at 9:16:01, while the cockpit voice recorder (CVR), using an emergency bus, cut off at 9:16:14.8, on impact with the ground. At 9:16:04, the stall warning sounded on the CVR. The last recorded words were Molin saying, "What the hell are we into, we're stuck in it" (9:16:07) with States replying, "Get out of it, get out of it." The aircraft slammed into the ground at Newport Avenue and Beach 131st Street.

Investigation

Initial terrorism concerns 

Because the crash occurred just two months and one day after the September 11 attacks – also in New York City – several major buildings including the Empire State Building and the headquarters of the United Nations were evacuated. In the months after the crash, rumors circulated that the plane had been destroyed in a terrorist plot. In May 2002, a Kuwaiti national named Mohammed Jabarah agreed to cooperate with investigators as part of a plea bargain. Among the details Jabarah gave authorities was a claim made to Jabarah by Khalid Sheikh Mohammed's lieutenant, who told Jabarah that Richard Reid and Abderraouf Jdey had both been enlisted by the al-Qaeda chief to carry out identical shoe-bombing plots as part of a second wave of attacks against the United States. According to this lieutenant, Jdey's bomb had successfully blown up Flight 587, while Reid's attempt had been foiled.

In May 2002, a Canadian government memorandum repeated the claims suggesting that Jdey had a role in the crash, while conceding that the reliability of the source of that information – Khalid Sheikh Mohammed's lieutenant – was unknown. According to the memo, Jdey – a naturalized Canadian citizen – was to use his Canadian passport to board the flight. While American Airlines' passenger manifest did indicate citizens boarding with passports from the United States, the Dominican Republic, Taiwan, France, Haiti, and Israel, no passengers boarded using a Canadian passport. According to NTSB spokesman Ted Lopatkiewicz, the weight of the memo's veracity was questioned, as no evidence of a terrorist traveling on board was found. The evidence suggested that the aircraft was brought down after a piece of the tail assembly, "the vertical fin, came off," while it did not indicate "any kind of event in the cabin."

NTSB investigation 

On the afternoon of the crash, the NTSB launched an investigation in search for a probable cause. Over the next three months, they conducted 349 interviews, and collected and reconstructed pieces of the aircraft. The Airbus A300 took off shortly after a JAL Boeing 747-400 using the same runway. It flew into the larger jet's wake, an area of turbulent air. The first officer attempted to stabilize the aircraft with alternating aggressive rudder inputs. The force of the air flowing against the moving rudder stressed the aircraft's vertical stabilizer, and eventually snapped it off entirely, causing the aircraft to lose control and crash. The NTSB concluded that the enormous stress on the vertical stabilizer was due to the first officer's "unnecessary and excessive" rudder inputs, and not the wake turbulence caused by the 747. The NTSB further stated, "if the first officer had stopped making additional inputs, the aircraft would have stabilized".  Contributing factors were characteristics of the Airbus A300-600's sensitive rudder system design and elements of the American Airlines Advanced Aircraft Maneuvering Training Program.

The manner in which the vertical stabilizer separated concerned investigators. The vertical stabilizer is connected to the fuselage with six attaching points.  Each point has two sets of attachment lugs, one made of composite material, another of aluminum, all connected by a titanium bolt; damage analysis showed that the bolts and aluminum lugs were intact, but not the composite lugs. This, coupled with two events earlier in the life of the aircraft, namely delamination in part of the vertical stabilizer prior to its delivery from Airbus's Toulouse factory, and an encounter with heavy turbulence in 1994, caused investigators to examine the use of composites. The possibility that the composite materials might not be as strong as previously supposed was a cause of concern, as they are used in other areas of the plane, including the engine mounting and the wings. Tests carried out on the vertical stabilizers from the accident aircraft, and from another similar aircraft, found that the strength of the composite material had not been compromised, and the NTSB concluded that the material had failed because it had been stressed beyond its design limit.

The crash was witnessed by hundreds of people, 349 of whom gave accounts of what they saw to the NTSB.  About half (52%) reported a fire or explosion before the plane hit the ground. Others stated that they saw a wing detach from the aircraft, when in fact it was the vertical stabilizer.

After the crash, Floyd Bennett Field's empty hangars were used as a makeshift morgue for the identification of crash victims.

Findings 

According to the official accident report, the first officer repeatedly moved the rudder from fully left to fully right. This caused increasing sideslip angles. The resulting hazardous sideslip angle led to extremely high aerodynamic loads that separated the vertical stabilizer. If the first officer had stopped moving the rudder at any time before the vertical stabilizer failed, the aircraft would have leveled out on its own, and the accident would have been avoided. The vertical stabilizer's structural performance was determined to be consistent with design specifications and exceeded certification requirements.

Contributing factors to the crash existed, as well. The first officer's predisposition to overreact to wake turbulence caused panic. American Airlines incorrectly taught pilots to use the rudder for wake turbulence recovery, resulting in the first officer's possible misunderstanding of the aircraft's response to full rudder at high airspeeds. Light rudder pedal forces and small pedal displacement of the A300-600 rudder pedal system increased the airplane's susceptibility to rudder misuse.

Most aircraft require increased pressure on the rudder pedals to achieve the same amount of rudder control at a higher speed. The Airbus A300 and later Airbus A310 models do not operate on a fly-by-wire flight control system, but instead use conventional mechanical flight controls. The NTSB asserted that the A300-600 rudder control system was vulnerable to unnecessarily excessive rudder inputs. The Allied Pilots Association, in its submission to the NTSB, argued that the unusual sensitivity of the rudder mechanism amounted to a design flaw that Airbus should have communicated to the airline. The main rationale for their position came from a 1997 report that referenced 10 incidents in which A300 tail fins had been stressed beyond their design limitation.

Airbus charged that the crash was mostly American Airlines' fault, arguing that the airline did not train its pilots properly about the characteristics of the rudder. Aircraft tail fins are designed to withstand full rudder deflection in one direction when below maneuvering speed, but this does not guarantee that they can withstand an abrupt shift in rudder from one direction to the other, let alone multiple abrupt shifts, like those generated by the first officer on this flight. The NTSB indicated that American Airlines' Advanced Aircraft Maneuvering Program (AAMP) tended to exaggerate the effects of wake turbulence on large aircraft, creating a simulation scenario whereby turbulence from a 747 creates a 90° roll (rather than the likely 5 to 10° roll, though not explaining this to the pilots) to maximize the training challenge. Therefore, pilots were being inadvertently trained to react more aggressively than was necessary. According to author Amy Fraher, this led to concerns of whether it was appropriate for the AAMP to be placing such importance on "the role of flight simulators in teaching airplane upset recovery at all." Fraher states that the key to understanding the crash of Flight 587 ultimately lay in "how the accident pilots' expectations about aircraft performance were erroneously established through 'clumsy' flight simulator training in American's AAMP."

Statement of probable cause 
From the NTSB report of the accident:

The National Transportation Safety Board determines that the probable cause of this accident was the in-flight separation of the vertical stabilizer as a result of the loads beyond ultimate design that were created by the first officer’s unnecessary and excessive rudder pedal inputs. Contributing to these rudder pedal inputs were characteristics of the Airbus A300-600 rudder system design and elements of the American Airlines Advanced Aircraft Maneuvering Program (AAMP).

Since the NTSB's report, American Airlines has modified its pilot training program.

Victims 

All 260 people aboard the plane died in the crash. Five bystanders on the ground were also killed. One of its victims, Hilda Yolanda Mayol, survived the September 11 attacks having escaped from the North Tower.

Las Américas International Airport officials created a private area for those who had come to the airport to meet passengers, some of whom were unaware that the airliner had crashed. The authorities at John F. Kennedy International Airport used the JFK Ramada Plaza to house relatives and friends of the victims of the crash. The family crisis center later moved to the Javits Center in Manhattan.

Cultural background 

In 2001, 51 weekly direct flights were made between JFK and the Dominican Republic, with additional flights in December. Most of the flights were offered by American Airlines, and the airline was described as having a virtual monopoly on the route. Around 90% of the passengers on the accident flight were of Dominican descent.

The Guardian described the flight as having "cult status" in Washington Heights, a Dominican area of Manhattan. Belkis Lora, a relative of a passenger on Flight 587, said, "Every Dominican in New York has either taken that flight or knows someone who has. It gets you there early. At home, there are songs about it." Seth Kugel, writing for The New York Times, said, "For many Dominicans in New York, these journeys home are the defining metaphor of their complex push-pull relationship with their homeland; they embody, vividly and poignantly, the tug between their current lives and their former selves. That fact gave Monday's tragedy a particularly horrible resonance for New York's Dominicans." He added, "Even before Monday's crash, Dominicans had developed a complex love-hate relationship with American Airlines, complaining about high prices and baggage restrictions even while favoring the carrier over other airlines that used to travel the same route." David Rivas, a New York City travel agency owner, said, "For the Dominican to go to Santo Domingo during Christmas and summer is like the Muslims going to Mecca."

The crash did not affect bookings for the JFK–Santo Domingo route. Dominicans continued to book travel on the flights until American Airlines ended services between JFK and Santo Domingo on April 1, 2013.

Memorial 

A memorial was constructed in Rockaway Park, the community adjoining Belle Harbor to the east, in memory of the 265 victims of the crash. It is situated beside the Rockaway Beach and Boardwalk at the south end of Beach 116th Street, a major commercial street in the area. It was dedicated on November 12, 2006, the fifth anniversary of the accident, in a ceremony attended by then-Mayor of New York City Michael Bloomberg. A ceremony commemorating the disaster is held annually at the memorial every November 12, featuring a reading of the names of those killed aboard the aircraft and on the ground, with a formal moment of silence observed at 9:16 am, the estimated time of the crash. The memorial wall, designed by Dominican artist Freddy Rodríguez and Situ Studio has windows and a doorway looking toward the nearby Atlantic Ocean and angled toward the Dominican Republic. It is inscribed with the names of the victims. Atop the memorial is a quotation, in both Spanish and English, from Dominican poet Pedro Mir: "" (which translates to "Afterwards I want nothing more than peace").

In a ceremony held on May 6, 2007, at Woodlawn Cemetery in the Bronx, 889 unidentified fragments of human remains of the victims of the crash were entombed in a group of four mausoleum crypts.

Documentaries 
Several documentaries have been made concerning the accident.

A 2006 episode of the National Geographic Channel program Seconds From Disaster examined the Flight 587 accident in detail. The episode was titled "Plane Crash in Queens" (also known as "New York Air Crash").

A 2006 episode of Modern Marvels on The History Channel aired an episode titled "Engineering Disasters 20", which featured detailed information on Flight 587. The Discovery Channel Canada / National Geographic series Mayday (also called Air Crash Investigation or Air Emergency) dramatized the accident in a 2014 episode titled "Queens Catastrophe". The BBC program Horizon also created an episode about the crash.

An episode of Aircrash Confidential on Discovery Channel also featured Flight 587.  The episode was titled "Pilot Error".

A 2011 episode of Why Planes Crash featured Flight 587. The episode was titled "Human Error" and was aired on MSNBC.

See also 
 List of accidents and incidents involving commercial aircraft

Notes

References

External links 

NTSB Docket including Cockpit Voice Recorder Transcript (76.5 KB; Archive; Alternate of archive)
 Archive of AA.com on November 13, 2001
 Bureau of Enquiry and Analysis for Civil Aviation Safety – Reporting on behalf of European manufacturer Airbus
 "Accident on November 12, 2001 in New York." (Archive)
  "Accident survenu le novembre 12, 2001 à New York." (Archive)
 Photos of the plane involved in the accident and of the crash scene from Airliners.net
 
 
 
 

2001 in New York City
Accidents and incidents involving the Airbus A300
Airliner accidents and incidents caused by in-flight structural failure
Airliner accidents and incidents caused by pilot error
Airliner accidents and incidents in New York City
587
Aviation accidents and incidents caused by wake turbulence
Aviation accidents and incidents in the United States in 2001
Dominican Republic–United States relations
2000s in Queens
November 2001 events in the United States
Rockaway, Queens